The 2015 Croatian Cup Final was a one-legged affair played between Dinamo Zagreb and RNK Split. The final was played in Zagreb on 20 May 2015. 

Dinamo Zagreb won the trophy after the penalty shoot-out. For the first time the final was played as a single game.

Road to the final

Match details

External links 
Official website 

2015 Final
GNK Dinamo Zagreb matches
Cup Final
Croatian Cup Final 2015